SC34 or S.C. 34 may refer to:
 (48792) 1997 SC34, asteroid belt minor planet
 ISO/IEC JTC 1/SC 34, ISO document subcommittee of Joint Technical Committee 1
 South Carolina Highway 34, primary state highway in South Carolina
 , United States Navy submarine chaser commissioned in 1918 and sold in 1921